Water trails (also known as blueways) are marked routes on navigable waterway such as rivers, lakes, canals, and coastlines for recreational use. They allow access to waterways for non-motorized boats and sometimes motorized vessels, inner tubes, and other craft. Water trails not only require suitable access points and take-outs for exit but also provide places ashore to camp and picnic or other facilities for boaters.

Water trails may be in public or private waters. In the United States, many water trails are assisted by the National Park Service. Local statutes may apply to landowners who steward water trails and the boaters who use them.

Much of the Trans Canada Trail will be a network of water trails open to canoes and other small vessels.

Recreational use of water trails is a form of ecotourism sometimes called "paddle tourism".

Notable water trails and blueways include:
Allagash Wilderness Waterway
Captain John Smith Chesapeake National Historic Trail
Lake Michigan National Water Trail from Chicago to New Buffalo, Michigan
Maine Island Trail
Northern Forest Canoe Trail
Ohio River Water Trail
Red Rock Water Trail
San Francisco Bay Area Water Trail
Shiawassee River Heritage Water Trail
Tennessee River Blueway
Tip of The Thumb Heritage Water Trail

References